Herbert Knowles (1798–1817) was an English poet.

Knowles was the author of the well-known Stanzas written in Richmond Churchyard, which gave promise of future excellence.  However, he died a few weeks after he had been enabled, through the help of Robert Southey to whom he had sent some of his poems, to go to the University of Cambridge.

External links

1798 births
1817 deaths
English male poets
19th-century English poets
19th-century English male writers